Mierlo War Cemetery is a Second World War Commonwealth war grave cemetery, located in the village of Mierlo,  east of Eindhoven in The Netherlands.

History
The cemetery was created in the spring of 1945. The majority of those buried here had fallen in battles between September and November 1944 in the region south and west of the River Meuse and during fighting for the Scheldt estuary. The Commonwealth War Graves Commission is responsible for the cemetery.

The cemetery contain 658 fallen service personnel; 648 are Commonwealth soldiers (seven unidentified) and one Dutch grave (of G.M. Stönner of the Princess Irene Brigade).

In 1982, an employee of the Commonwealth War Graves Commission was also buried in the cemetery.

The graves are arranged in eight sections (numbered 1 to 8) with six or seven rows in each section (A to F or G).

The Cross of Sacrifice at the cemetery was designed by Sir Reginald Blomfield.

In September 2019 the cemetery was vandalized with graffiti. The damage included letters on the gravestones, a swastika in the chapel and graffiti on the Cross of Sacrifice. There was also the graffiti "MH17 lie" in reference to the shooting down of flight MH17.

Photographs

Notes

References

External links

 
 Description of the monument on the website of the Dutch Nationaal Comité 4 en 5 mei
 

1945 establishments in the Netherlands
Commonwealth War Graves Commission cemeteries in the Netherlands
Cemeteries in the Netherlands
Cemeteries in North Brabant
Geldrop-Mierlo
20th-century architecture in the Netherlands